The OneAmerica Tower, formerly AUL Tower, is a 38-story building at 200 North Illinois Street in downtown Indianapolis, Indiana. It is used by various companies for offices. The building opened in 1982 and is faced with Indiana limestone. From 1982 to 1990, the OneAmerica Tower was the tallest building in the state of Indiana. The OneAmerica Tower is currently the second-tallest building in Indianapolis, behind Salesforce Tower, as well as, the second-tallest in Indiana.

There is no observation deck in the tower. However, views of Indianapolis and the surrounding cities can be seen from "The Skyline Club", a private club and restaurant on the 36th floor. The rest of the building is not accessible by the general public due to the addition of electronic turnstiles in front of the elevators in the lobby.

See also
List of tallest buildings in Indianapolis
List of tallest buildings in Indiana

References

External links

OneAmerica Tower at SkyscraperPage
OneAmerica Tower at Emporis

Skyscraper office buildings in Indianapolis
1982 establishments in Indiana

Skidmore, Owings & Merrill buildings
Office buildings completed in 1982